William Henry Sadler IV (born September 21, 1981) is a former right-handed relief pitcher. He is a 2000 graduate of Pensacola (Florida) Catholic High School and was named Florida Class 3A Player of the Year his senior year
He attended Pensacola Junior College in 2001 and 2002 and transferred to Louisiana State University in 2003.
He led LSU with four saves, but took the loss when the Tigers were eliminated from the 2003 College World Series by the University of South Carolina.

San Francisco Giants
Sadler was selected by Seattle in the 37th round (1106th overall pick) of the  amateur draft and in the 30th round (909th overall pick) of the  draft, but opted not to sign with the Mariners. He signed with the Giants after they made him their sixth round selection (183rd overall pick) in the  draft.

In his first four seasons in the Giants minor league system, Sadler played for the Hagerstown Suns of the Single-A South Atlantic League (2003); the San Jose Giants of the advanced Single-A California League; the Norwich Navigators (2004–) and the Connecticut Defenders of the Double-A Eastern League; and the Fresno Grizzlies of the Triple-A Pacific Coast League (2006). Pitching almost exclusively out of the bullpen, he compiled a 14-13 win–loss record with 27 saves and a 3.06 ERA through the end of the 2006 season. In 2006, he posted 20 saves as the Defenders' closer. Between Connecticut and Fresno, he struck out 78 batters in  innings while holding opponents to a .148 batting average.

Sadler's minor league success in 2006 earned him a spot on the Giants' September expanded roster when Armando Benítez was placed on the 60-day disabled list.
He made his major league debut the following night against St. Louis. After surrendering a walk to Scott Spiezio and a 3-run double to Scott Rolen, he settled down to retire the next four consecutive hitters, including his first big-league strike out.

On August 10, 2009 Sadler was released by the San Francisco Giants.

Houston Astros
On August 18, 2009, Sadler signed a minor league contract with the Houston Astros.

References

External links

MLB.com Player File
The Baseball Cube player page

1981 births
American baseball players of Japanese descent
Baseball players from Florida
Connecticut Defenders players
Fresno Grizzlies players
Gulf Coast Astros players
Hagerstown Suns players
Houston Astros players
Living people
LSU Tigers baseball players
Major League Baseball pitchers
Norwich Navigators players
Pensacola State Pirates baseball players
Round Rock Express players
San Francisco Giants players
San Jose Giants players
Sportspeople from Pensacola, Florida